Botley Road is the main road into the centre of Oxford, England from the west. It stretches between Botley, on the Oxford Ring Road (A34) to the west of the city, and Frideswide Square at the junction with Oxford railway station, close to central Oxford.

Overview 
The Botley Road was known as the Botley Turnpike Road in the 18th century and Seven Bridges Road in the 19th century. Until the early 19th century it was little more than a track and highwaymen were a problem.

The road passes Osney. Out-of-town retail stores line the route. The road is designated as the A420. It becomes West Way at Botley Bridge over Seacourt Stream to the west. To the east, past the station, it becomes Park End Street. Oxpens Road leads off to the south at this junction. Along its route are several bridges — west to east: Botley Bridge, Bulstake Bridge, Osney Ditch Bridge, and Osney Bridge — as it passes over various sidechannels and the main branch of the River Thames.

Side streets, as well as most of the road between the railway station and the Beaumont veterinary practice, are mostly residential, and are flanked by two large parks (Botley Park, adjacent to West Oxford Community Centre, and Oatlands Park, near the Osney Mead industrial estate). The Botley Road is an important bus and commuter route to Oxford, and Seacourt Park and Ride is located near the junction with the A34.  

Eastbound, it has a bus lane from the ring road until just before Osney Island, at which point there is a set of bus advancement traffic lights. It has cycle lanes in both directions. South from the eastern end, via Mill Street, are the site of Osney Abbey (now destroyed), Osney Cemetery (established 1848), Osney Lock, Osney Mill, and Osney Mill Marina.

Closure for station development
In October 2022, Network Rail said that Botley Road was likely to be closed at the railway station for the whole of 2023.
 In December 2022, Network Rail said they were looking at how to reduce the impact of the work on the local community and that they did not need to start the full closure of Botley Road in January 2023. Under revised plans announced by Network Rail in March 2023, Botley Road will be closed at the railway bridge from 11 April to the end of October to allow utility services to divert their infrastructure under the bridge and undertake other enabling work. The road will then close again from spring 2024 for the bridge to be replaced.

Development 
From the railway station:
 Roads on the north side: Rodger Dudman Way, Cripley Road, Abbey Road, Henry Road, Helen Road, Binsey Lane (leading to Binsey), Prestwich Place, Osney Court and Bullstake Court.
 Roads on the south Side: Mill Street, Bridge Street (leading to Osney Island), Ferry Hinksey Road (leading to the Osney Mead industrial estate), Hill View Road, Alexander Road, Oatlands Road, Harley Road, Riverside Road, Duke Street, Earl Street, Lamarsh Road, North Hinksey Lane.
  
The development of roads between Osney Island and Bullstake Stream started in the 1890s. Oatlands Meadow, owned by Morrell's Trustees, was first advertised in 1894. Thomas Gable, an Oxford publican, laid out Hill View Road in 1895, providing plots for others to develop. Thomas Gable died later that year and Kingerlee builders bought the unsold plots along the rest of Hill View Road. In 1901 they gained permission for a building estate extending from Alexandra Road to Riverside Road. The firm also acquired consent to develop the land north of Botley Road, and laid out Henry Road and Helen Road (named after Thomas Henry Kingerlee's eldest children) and part of Binsey Lane in 1902. Harley Road and Riverside Road were laid out in 1919, and built in the following few years.

Quotations 
Author and Oxford scholar C. S. Lewis mentions the road to Botley comically in his autobiography. Describing his first-ever arrival in Oxford as a young student, he writes:

Crime novelist Colin Dexter writes:

See also
 Ferry Hinksey Road, south off Botley Road

References

External links 
  West Oxford
 West Oxford Community Centre
 History of the landscape of West Oxford

Streets in Oxford
Roads in Oxfordshire